John Lalor Fitzpatrick (1875 – 8 December 1956) was Irish Parliamentary Party MP for Queen's County Ossory from 1916 to 1918.

He was the grandson of the MP for Queen's County Leix Richard Lalor whose brother was James Fintan Lalor.

References

External links 
 

1875 births
1956 deaths
Members of the Parliament of the United Kingdom for Queen's County constituencies (1801–1922)
UK MPs 1910–1918
John Lalor
Irish Parliamentary Party MPs